The 1905 Detroit College Tigers football team  was an American football team that represented Detroit College (renamed the University of Detroit in 1911) as an independent during the 1905 college football season. Jerry Girardin was hired in mid-October as the team's head coach. The team initially had a schedule with six opponents. However, on November 9, the college's president, Rev. Kellinger, refused to allow the football team to play the Detroit University School and declared that football "as it is played today is altogether too rough" and that the game was also too expensive.  In response, coach Girardin said he would never coach a team of the college again. The team was then disbanded.

Schedule

References

Detroit College Tigers
Detroit Titans football seasons
College football undefeated seasons
Detroit College Tigers football
Detroit College Tigers football